The Cincinnati Group is a geologic group in Kentucky, Ohio and Indiana. It is Upper Ordovician.

See also

 List of fossiliferous stratigraphic units in Kentucky
 List of fossiliferous stratigraphic units in Ohio
 List of fossiliferous stratigraphic units in Indiana

References
 

Geologic groups of Kentucky
Geologic groups of Ohio
Geologic groups of Indiana